Michael Ohana (4 October 1995) is an Israeli professional footballer who plays as a forward and as an attacking midfielder for F.C. Ashdod and the Israel national team.

Club career
Ohana was born in Jerusalem and began playing football at the age of 11 in the local team Hapoel Jerusalem. He also played in the youth teams of Beitar Jerusalem and Maccabi Tel Aviv, before moving to F.C. Ashdod youth team at the age of 16.

FC Ashdod 
On August 7, 2012, Ohana made his debut in the first team of F.C. Ashdod, when he entered as a substitute in the 4–0 loss to Hapoel Ramat Gan in the Toto Cup. Four months later, in December, Ohana made his debut in Ligat Ha'Al, when he came in as a substitute in the 2–1 loss to Bnei Sakhnin. Until the end of the season, Ohana played 4 more times in the first team. In the following season he played five times in the first team, while continuing to play in the youth team of the club.

In 2014–15 season, Ohana became a key player in the first team of FC Ashdod, under Nir Klinger. Ohana scored two goals this season in 31 games, but his team was relegated to Liga Leumit at the end of the season. One season later, in 2015–16, Ohana again scored two goals, and helped the team to reach a promotion to Ligat Ha'Al, after only one season in Liga Leumit.

Hapoel Be'er Sheva 
On 7 September 2016, the deadline day of the transfer window, Ohana signed a five-year deal with Israeli Premier League champions Hapoel Be'er Sheva, for a reported fee of €1 million. As part of this deal, Be'er Sheva midfielder Dan Bitton was loaned to FC Ashdod for two years. Ohana was not registered to the UEFA Europa League campaign of Hapoel Be'er Sheva, but impressed in Ligat Ha'Al and scored his first goal on 15 October, in the 5–0 win against Maccabi Petah Tikva. Ohana scored an amazing goal with his heel, and some even compared this goal to Dennis Bergkamp against Newcastle in 2002.

Beitar Jerusalem 
On June 20, 2019, Ohana signed a three-year deal with Beitar Jerusalem who paid fifty percent of his ticket for about €2 million.

Maccabi Netanya 
On August 10 2022, Ohana signed a new contract with Maccabi Netanya.

International career 
Ohana played in all youth national teams of Israel, and scored 4 goals in 17 appearances in Israel Under-19, which he led with Eli Ohana as head coach to qualification to the Under-19 European Championship. On 26 March 2015, Ohana made his debut in the Under-21 national team, in an international friendly game against Cyprus. He scored 4 goals in 9 appearances in the Under-21 team.

On 6 November 2016, Ohana was called up for the first time, by Elisha Levy, to the squad of Israel national team, for the 2018 FIFA World Cup qualifiers game against Albania.

Honours

Club
 Hapoel Be'er Sheva
Israeli Premier League: 2016–17, 2017–18
Toto Cup Top Division: 2016–17
Israel Super Cup: 2017

 Beitar Jerusalem
Israeli Toto Cup: 2019–20

Individual
2014 UEFA Euro U19: Team of the Tournament

References

External links 
 

1995 births
Israeli Jews
Living people
Israeli footballers
F.C. Ashdod players
Hapoel Be'er Sheva F.C. players
Beitar Jerusalem F.C. players
Maccabi Netanya F.C. players
Footballers from Jerusalem
Association football midfielders
Liga Leumit players
Israeli Premier League players
Israeli people of Moroccan-Jewish descent
Israel under-21 international footballers